Highly Creek is a stream in Holt County in the U.S. state of Missouri. It is a tributary of the Nodaway River.

Highly Creek has the name of William Highley, a pioneer citizen.

See also
List of rivers of Missouri

References

Rivers of Holt County, Missouri
Rivers of Missouri